New Mexico is a 1951 American Western film directed by Irving Reis and starring Lew Ayres and Marilyn Maxwell.

Plot 
President Abraham Lincoln himself comes to New Mexico to discuss living together in peace with Acoma, a feared and respected Indian chief. He presents the chief with a cane as a gift and symbol of their friendship.

Lt. Hunt is promoted due to his personal assistance to Lincoln in arranging the truce. Unhappily, a bigoted superior officer, Col. McComb, and the dastardly Judge Wilcox are opposed to any such treaty. When Hunt states his objection, McComb has him placed under arrest alongside Acoma and a number of Indian braves, also breaking the truce cane.

Other members of the tribe break them out of jail, killing McComb and others in the process. Hunt takes command and cancels all travel in the region, angering a woman named Cherry who is planning a trip to Nevada. She arrogantly elects to leave anyway, as does Judge Wilcox, so a company of men led by Hunt goes along as escort.

The Indians attack, frightening the two women and burying the judge in the sand. Hunt is disgusted with Cherry's selfish attitude and tells her so. She comes to know one of Acoma's sons, and when another uprising has fatal consequence for the Indian warriors as well as Hunt, she and Acoma's son are lucky to have their lives spared.

Cast
 Lew Ayres as Capt. Hunt
 Marilyn Maxwell as Cherry
 Andy Devine as Sgt. Garrity
 Robert Hutton as Lt. Vermont
 Donald Buka as Pvt. Van Vechton
 Ted de Corsia as Acoma - Indian Chief
 Lloyd Corrigan as Judge Wilcox
 John Hoyt as Sgt. Harrison
 Jeff Corey as Coyote
 Raymond Burr as Pvt. Anderson
 Verna Felton as Mrs. Fenway
 Ian MacDonald as Pvt. Daniels
 Peter Price as Chia-Kong
 Walter Greaza as Col. McComb (as Walter N. Greaza)

References

External links
 
 
 

1951 films
American Western (genre) films
1951 Western (genre) films
Films directed by Irving Reis
Films set in New Mexico
Western (genre) cavalry films
1950s English-language films
1950s American films
United Artists films